Nichol is a surname. Notable people with the name include:

 B. P. Nichol, Canadian poet
 Bob Nichol, Canadian curler
 Caleb Nichol, fictional character from The O.C.
 Camilla Nichol, British geologist
 Gene Nichol, former College of William & Mary president
 Hailey Nichol, fictional character from The O.C.
 Helen Nichol (badminton), Canadian badminton player
 John Nichol (biographer), Scottish writer, son of John Pringle Nichol
 John Nichol (RAF officer), RAF Navigator shot down and captured in the first Gulf War
 John Lang Nichol, Canadian politician
 John Pringle Nichol, Scottish astronomer
 Joseph McGinty Nichol, American film director McG
 Phil Nichol, Canadian comedian
 Robert Nichol (Canadian politician), historical figure in Upper Canada
 Scott Nichol, Canadian ice hockey player

See also
 Nicol, given name and surname
 Nicholl, surname
 Nichols (surname)

Patronymic surnames
Surnames from given names